The 1943 Istanbul Football Cup season was the second season of the cup. Galatasaray won the cup for the second time. The tournament was single-elimination.

Season

Final
October 1, 1943

|}
Goals for Galatasaray: Gündüz Kılıç(2), Cemil Gürgen Erlertürk
Goals for Beşiktaş: Kemal Gülçelik

References

Istanbul Football Cup
Istanbul